is a Japanese football player who plays for Taiwanese football club AC Taipei.

Club statistics
Updated to 6 November 2020.

References

External links

1985 births
Living people
Association football people from Tokyo
Japanese footballers
J1 League players
J2 League players
J3 League players
Japan Football League players
Taiwan Football Premier League players
Tokyo Verdy players
Sagan Tosu players
Vegalta Sendai players
Fagiano Okayama players
Matsumoto Yamaga FC players
FC Ryukyu players
Thespakusatsu Gunma players
Taichung Futuro F.C. players
Footballers at the 2006 Asian Games
Association football defenders
Asian Games competitors for Japan